Readymade Ganda is a 1991 Indian Kannada-language romantic comedy film, written by Shankar Bhat and directed by Sai Prakash. The film stars Shashikumar and Malashri. 

The film's music was composed by Upendra Kumar and the audio was launched under the Lahari Music banner.

Cast 
Shashikumar 
Malashri 
Hema Choudhary
Doddanna
Sihi Kahi Chandru
Rathasapthami Aravind
Guru Murthy 
Narasimha moorthi 
K. D. Venkatesh 
Kunigal Nagabhushan 
M. S. Karanth 
Danny 
Johnny 
M.S.Umesh as Ganapathi 
Ananthrao maccheri 
Sudha Narasimharaju
Bank Janardhan
Mukhyamantri Chandru
Vaishali Kasaravalli
Kaminidharan
Master Sunil

Soundtrack 
The music of the film was composed by Upendra Kumar, with lyrics by R. N. Jayagopal.

References 

1991 films
1990s Kannada-language films
Indian romantic comedy films
1991 romantic comedy films
Films scored by Upendra Kumar
Films directed by Sai Prakash